Zoltán Ozoray Schenker (13 October 1880 – 25 August 1966) was a Hungarian Olympic sabre and foil fencer, who won three Olympic medals.

Early life
Schenker was born in Váradszentmárton, Hungary (now Sânmartin, Bihor County, Romania), and was Jewish.

Olympics

Schenker appeared in three Olympiads, winning three medals.

At the 1912 Summer Olympics in Stockholm at the age of 31, Schenker won a gold medal in the team sabre event, and placed fourth in individual sabre. In individual foil, he was eliminated in the semifinal round.

At the 1924 Summer Olympics in Paris at the age of 43, he won a bronze medal in team foil and a silver medal in team sabre. In individual events, Schenker placed fourth in individual sabre and was eliminated in the first round in individual foil.

Schenker also competed in individual foil at the 1928 Summer Olympics in Amsterdam at the age of 47, where he reached the semifinals but lost to bronze medalist fellow Hungarian János Garay.

Writing
Schenker was also an author on fencing. He authored A modern magyar kardvívás (Sport Lap- és Könyvkiadó, 1956), Säbelflechten (Corvina, 1961), and co-authored  with Adam Papée and Tadeusz Friedrich (Sport i Turystyka, 1962).

He died in Budapest, Hungary, in 1966. He was buried at the Farkasréti Cemetery.

See also
 List of select Jewish fencers

References

External links
 Olympic medals

1880 births
1966 deaths
Hungarian people of German descent
Hungarian male foil fencers
Olympic fencers of Hungary
Fencers at the 1912 Summer Olympics
Fencers at the 1924 Summer Olympics
Fencers at the 1928 Summer Olympics
Olympic gold medalists for Hungary
Olympic silver medalists for Hungary
Olympic bronze medalists for Hungary
Olympic medalists in fencing
Medalists at the 1912 Summer Olympics
Medalists at the 1924 Summer Olympics
Jewish male foil fencers
Jewish male sabre fencers
Jewish Hungarian sportspeople
People from Bihor County
Burials at Farkasréti Cemetery
Hungarian male sabre fencers